The 2018 Danish Individual Speedway Championship was the 2018 edition of the Danish Individual Speedway Championship. As in 2017, the final was staged over a single round at the Granly Speedway Arena. Niels Kristian Iversen won his seventh national title, tying Nicki Pedersen for second on the all-time list. It was also only the second time in the history of the competition that a rider won seven successive titles, with Ole Olsen also completing the feat in 1973.

Mikkel Michelsen finished second, with Pedersen third and Kenneth Bjerre fourth.

Event format 
Each rider competed in five rides, with the four top scorers racing in an additional heat. The points from the additional heat were then added to the previous score from the five riders. The winner was the rider who accumulated the most points in all of their rides, and not the rider who won the additional heat.

Final 

{| width=100%
|width=50% valign=top|
4 August 2018
 Esbjerg

References 

Denmark
Speedway in Denmark
2018 in Danish motorsport